The Idolothripinae are a subfamily of thrips, with about 82 genera.

Genera
This list of genera in the subfamily Phlaeothripinae is complete according to the Thrips of the World Checklist (January 4, 2007).

 Acallurothrips 
 Actinothrips 
 Aesthesiothrips 
 Allidothrips 
 Allopisothrips 
 Allothrips 
 Anactinothrips 
 Anaglyptothrips 
 Anallothrips 
 Atractothrips 
 Azeugmatothrips 
 Bacillothrips 
 Bactrothrips 
 Bolothrips 
 Campulothrips 
 Carientothrips 
 Celidothrips 
 Ceuthothrips 
 Cleistothrips 
 Compsothrips 
 Cryptothrips 
 Cylindrothrips 
 Cyphothrips 
 Dermothrips 
 Diaphorothrips 
 Diceratothrips 
 Dichaetothrips 
 Dinothrips 
 Diplacothrips
 Ecacleistothrips 
 Egchocephalothrips 
 Elaphrothrips 
 Elgonima 
 Emprosthiothrips 
 Ethirothrips 
 Faureothrips 
 Gastrothrips 
 Hartwigia 
 Heptathrips 
 Herathrips 
 Holurothrips 
 Hybridothrips 
 Hystricothrips 
 Idolothrips 
 Illinothrips 
 Ischyrothrips 
 Lamillothrips 
 Lasiothrips 
 Loyolaia 
 Machatothrips 
 Macrothrips 
 Malesiathrips 
 Mecynothrips 
 Megalothrips 
 Megathrips 
 Meiothrips 
 Minaeithrips
 Neatractothrips 
 Neosmerinthothrips 
 Nesidiothrips 
 Nesothrips 
 Ophthalmothrips 
 Ozothrips 
 Paractinothrips 
 Pelinothrips 
 Peltariothrips 
 Phacothrips 
 Phaulothrips 
 Pinaceothrips 
 Polytrichothrips 
 Priesneriana 
 Priesneriella 
 Pseudocryptothrips 
 Pseudoeurhynchothrips 
 Pygothrips 
 Saurothrips 
 Sporothrips 
 Tarassothrips 
 Tiarothrips 
 Zactinothrips 
 Zeuglothrips 
 Zeugmatothrips

References

Insect subfamilies
Phlaeothripidae